Dođi i uzmi me (Come and Get Me) is the third studio album by Bosnian-Serbian pop-folk recording artist Seka Aleksić. It was released 30 July 2005 through the record label Grand Production.

Track listing

References

2005 albums
Seka Aleksić albums
Grand Production albums